Orinoquia can refer to one of two largely overlapping areas:

The Orinoquía Region of Colombia
The watershed of the Orinoco River, in Venezuela and Colombia